There is no national language in the Republic of India.  However, article 343(1) of the Indian constitution specifically mentions that "The official language of the Union shall be Hindi in Devanagari script. The form of numerals to be used for the official purposes of the Union shall be the international form of Indian numerals," while clause 3 of the Official Languages Act, 1963 mentions the "Continuation of English Language for official purposes of the Union and for use in Parliament", thus denoting Hindi and English as the official languages of the Union. Business in the Indian parliament may only be conducted in Hindi or in English. However, according to Article 120, members of parliament are allowed to speak and present their views in any of the 22 scheduled languages recognized by the Constitution of India. English is allowed to be used in official purposes such as parliamentary proceedings, judiciary, communications between the Central Government and a State Government. There are various official languages in India at the state/territory level. States within India have the liberty and powers to specify their own official language(s) through legislation. In addition to the official languages, the constitution recognizes 22 regional languages, which include Hindi but not English, as scheduled languages (see below).

States can specify their own official language(s) through legislation. The section of the Constitution of India dealing with official languages, therefore, includes detailed provisions which deal not just with the languages used for the official purposes of the union, but also with the languages that are to be used for the official purposes of each state and union territory in the country, and the languages that are to be used for communication between the union and the states.

History 
The official languages of India before independence were English, Urdu and later Hindi, with English being used for purposes at the central level. The origins of official Hindi usage traces back to 1900, when MacDonnell issued an order, which allowed the “permissive — but not exclusive — use” of Devanagari for Hindustani in the courts of North-Western Provinces. The Indian constitution, adopted in 1950, envisaged that English would be phased out in favour of Hindi, over a fifteen-year period, but gave Parliament the power to, by law, provide for the continued use of English even thereafter. Plans to make Hindi the sole official language of the Republic were met with resistance in many parts of the country, especially in Tamil Nadu. English and Hindi continue to be used today, in combination with other (at the central level and in some states) official languages.

The legal framework governing the use of languages for official purpose currently is the Official Languages Act, 1963, the Official Language Rules, 1976, and various state laws, as well as rules and regulations made by the central government and the states.

Scheduled languages of the Indian Constitution 
The Eighth Schedule to the Constitution of India contains a list of 22 scheduled languages. The table below lists the 22 scheduled languages of the Republic of India as set out in the Eighth Schedule as of May 2008, together with the regions where they are widely spoken and used as the state's official language. However, states are not mandated to choose their official languages from the scheduled languages. Sindhi is not official in any states or union territories even though it is listed in the Eighth Schedule.

List

Benefits

For all the scheduled languages 
The scheduled languages have the following benefits:
 Best Feature Film in any of the scheduled languages are eligible for the National Film Awards.
 Literary works in any of the scheduled languages are eligible for the Sahitya Akademi Awards, the Sahitya Akademi Translation Prizes and the Sahitya Akademi Yuva Puraskar.
 Literary works in any of the scheduled languages are eligible for the Gyanpeeth Awards (Jnanpith Awards).
 People who contribute to the literature of any of the scheduled languages are eligible for the Sahitya Akademi Fellowship, which is more honourable than even receiving the Sahitya Akademi Award.
 Prose or poetry literary works in any of the scheduled languages are eligible for the Saraswati Samman, the highest among all the literary awards in India.
 Writers who contribute to the literature of any of the scheduled languages are eligible for the Bhasha Samman Awards.
 Candidates for Union Public Service Commission can appear examination for optional papers in any of the literature of the scheduled languages.

For some of the scheduled languages 
 11 out of the 22 scheduled languages are made available in the official website of the Indian Prime Minister's Office, namely Assamese, Bengali, Gujarati, Kannada, Malayalam, Meitei (Manipuri), Marathi, Odia, Punjabi, Tamil and Telugu in addition to English and Hindi.
 14 out of the 22 scheduled languages are made available in the Press Information Bureau (PIB) by the Ministry of Information and Broadcasting of the Government of India (GOI), namely Dogri, Punjabi, Bengali, Oriya, Gujarati, Marathi, Meitei (Manipuri), Tamil, Kannada, Telugu, Malayalam, Konkani and Urdu, in addition to Hindi and English.
 13 out of the 22 scheduled languages are selected by the Staff Selection Commission (SSC) of the Government of India, to be made available in the conduction of the Multi-Tasking (Non-Technical) Staff examination across the country, namely Urdu, Tamil, Malayalam, Telugu, Kannada, Assamese, Bengali, Gujarati, Konkani, Meitei (Manipuri), Marathi, Odia and Punjabi, in addition to Hindi and English.

Demands for scheduled language status
At present, as per the Ministry of Home Affairs, there are demands for inclusion of 38 more languages
in the Eighth Schedule to the Constitution. These are: Angika, Banjara, Bajjika, Bhojpuri, Bhoti, Bhotia, Bundelkhandi, Chhattisgarhi, Dhatki, English, Garhwali, Gondi, Gujjari, Ho, Kachhi, Kamtapuri, Karbi, Khasi, Kodava, Kokborok, Kumaoni, Kurukh, Kurmali, Lepcha, Limbu, Mizo, Magahi, Mundari, Nagpuri, Nicobarese, Pahari, Pali, Rajasthani, Sambalpuri, Shauraseni Prakrit, Saraiki, Tenyidi and Tulu.

Official languages of the Union

The Indian constitution, in 1950, declared Hindi in Devanagari script to be the official language of the union. Unless Parliament decided otherwise, the use of English for official purposes was to cease 15 years after the constitution came into effect, that is, on 26 January 1965. The prospect of the changeover, however, led to much alarm in the non-Hindi-speaking areas of India, especially Dravidian-speaking states whose languages were not related to Hindi at all. As a result, Parliament enacted the Official Languages Act, 1963, which provided for the continued use of English for official purposes along with Hindi, even after 1965.

In late 1964, an attempt was made to expressly provide for an end to the use of English, but it was met with protests from states and territories such as Maharashtra, Tamil Nadu, Punjab, West Bengal, Karnataka, Puducherry, Nagaland, Mizoram and Andhra Pradesh. Some of these protests also turned violent. As a result, the proposal was dropped, and the Act itself was amended in 1967 to provide that the use of English would not be ended until a resolution to that effect was passed by the legislature of every state that had not adopted Hindi as its official language, and by each house of the Indian Parliament.

The position was thus that the Union government continues to use English in addition to Hindi for its official purposes as a "subsidiary official language", but is also required to prepare and execute a program to progressively increase its use of Hindi. The exact extent to which, and the areas in which, the Union government uses Hindi and English, respectively, is determined by the provisions of the Constitution, the Official Languages Act, 1963, the Official Languages Rules, 1976, and statutory instruments made by the Department of Official Language under these laws.

Department of Official Language was set up in June 1975 as an independent Department of the Ministry of Home Affairs.

Parliamentary proceedings and laws 
The Indian constitution distinguishes the language to be used in Parliamentary proceedings, and the language in which laws are to be made. Parliamentary business, according to the Constitution, may be conducted in either Hindi or English. The use of English in parliamentary proceedings was to be phased out at the end of fifteen years unless Parliament chose to extend its use, which Parliament did through the Official Languages Act, 1963. Also, the constitution permits a person who is unable to express themselves in either Hindi or English to, with the permission of the Speaker of the relevant House, address the House in their mother tongue.

In contrast, the constitution requires the authoritative text of all laws, including Parliamentary enactments and statutory instruments, to be in English, until Parliament decides otherwise. Parliament has not exercised its power to so decide, instead merely requiring that all such laws and instruments, and all bills brought before it, also be translated into Hindi, though the English text remains authoritative. The Official Languages act, 1963 provides that the authoritative text of central acts, rules, regulations, etc., are published in Hindi as well in the official gazette by President of India.

Judiciary 
The constitution provides, and the Supreme Court of India has reiterated, that all proceedings in the Supreme Court (the country's highest court) and the High Courts shall be in English. Parliament has the power to alter this by law but has not done so. However, in many high courts, there is, with consent from the president, allowance of the optional use of Hindi. Such proposals have been successful in the states of Rajasthan, Madhya Pradesh, Uttar Pradesh, and Bihar.

Administration 
The Official Language Act provides that the Union government shall use both Hindi and English in most administrative documents that are intended for the public, though the Union government is required by law to promote the use of Hindi. The Official Languages Rules, in contrast, provide for a higher degree of use of Hindi in communications between offices of the central government (other than offices in Tamil Nadu, to which the rules do not apply). Communications between different departments within the central government may be in English and Hindi (though the English text remains authoritative), although a translation into the other language must be provided if required. Communications within offices of the same department, however, must be in Hindi if the offices are in Hindi-speaking states, and in either Hindi or English otherwise with Hindi being used in proportion to the percentage of staff in the receiving office who have a working knowledge of Hindi. Notes and memos in files may be in English and Hindi (though the English text remains authoritative), with the Government having a duty to provide a translation into the other language if required.

Besides, every person submitting a petition for the redress of a grievance to a government officer or authority has a constitutional right to submit it in any language used in India.

Implementation
Various steps have been taken by the Indian government to implement the use and familiarisation of Hindi extensively. Dakshina Bharat Hindi Prachar Sabha headquartered at Chennai was formed to spread Hindi in South Indian states. Regional Hindi implementation offices at Bengaluru, Thiruvananthapuram, Mumbai, Kolkata, Guwahati, Bhopal, Delhi and Ghaziabad have been established to monitor the implementation of Hindi in Central government offices and PSUs.

Annual targets are set by the Department of Official Language regarding the amount of correspondence being carried out in Hindi. A Parliament Committee on Official Language constituted in 1976 periodically reviews the progress in the use of Hindi and submits a report to the President. The governmental body which makes policy decisions and established guidelines for the promotion of Hindi is the Kendriya Hindi Samiti (est. 1967). In every city that has more than ten central Government offices, a Town Official Language Implementation Committee is established and cash awards are given to government employees who write books in Hindi. All Central government offices and PSUs are to establish Hindi Cells for implementation of Hindi in their offices.

In 2016, the government announced plans to promote Hindi in government offices in Southern and Northeast India.

The Indian constitution does not specify the official languages to be used by the states for the conduct of their official functions and leaves each state free to, through its legislature, adopt Hindi or any language used in its territory as its official language or languages. The language need not be one of those listed in the Eighth Schedule, and several states have adopted official languages which are not so listed. Examples include Kokborok in Tripura and Mizo in Mizoram.

Legislature and administration 
The constitutional provisions in relation to use of the official language in legislation at the State level largely mirror those relating to the official language at the central level, with minor variations. State legislatures may conduct their business in their official language, Hindi or (for a transitional period, which the legislature can extend if it so chooses) English, and members who cannot use any of these have the same rights to their mother tongue with the Speaker's permission. The authoritative text of all laws must be in English unless Parliament passes a law permitting a state to use another language, and if the original text of a law is in a different language, an authoritative English translation of all laws must be prepared.

The state has the right to regulate the use of its official language in public administration, and in general, neither the constitution nor any central enactment imposes any restriction on this right. However, every person submitting a petition for the redress of a grievance to any officer or authority of the state government has a constitutional right to submit it in any language used in that state, regardless of its official status.

Besides, the constitution grants the central government, acting through the President, the power to issue certain directives to the government of a state in relation to the use of minority languages for official purposes. The President may direct a State to officially recognize a language spoken in its territory for specified purposes and in specified regions if its speakers demand it and satisfy him that a substantial proportion of the State's population desires its use. Similarly, States and local authorities are required to endeavor to provide primary education in the mother tongue for all linguistic minorities, regardless of whether their language is official in that State, and the President has the power to issue directions he deems necessary to ensure that they are provided these facilities.

State judiciary 
States have significantly less freedom in relation to determining the language in which judicial proceedings in their respective High Courts will be conducted. The constitution gives the power to authorize the use of Hindi, or the state's official language in proceedings of the High Court to the Governor, rather than the state legislature and requires the Governor to obtain the consent of the President of India, who in these matters acts on the advice of the Government of India. The Official Languages Act gives the Governor a similar power, subject to similar conditions, in relation to the language in which the High Court's judgments will be delivered.

Four states—Bihar, Uttar Pradesh, Madhya Pradesh and Rajasthan— have been granted the right to conduct proceedings in their High Courts in their official language, which, for all of them, was Hindi. However, the only non-Hindi state to seek a similar power—Tamil Nadu, which sought the right to conduct proceedings in Tamil in its High Court—had its application rejected by the central government earlier, which said it was advised to do so by the Supreme Court. In 2006, the law ministry said that it would not object to Tamil Nadu state's desire to conduct Madras High Court proceedings in Tamil. In 2010, the Chief Justice of the Madras High Court allowed lawyers to argue cases in Tamil.

Official languages of states 
 
List of official languages of states of India

Official languages of Union Territories 
 
Official languages of Union Territories

Union–state and interstate communication 

The language in which communications between different states, or from the union government to a state or a person in a state, shall be sent is regulated by the Official Languages Act and, for states other than Tamil Nadu, by the Official Languages Rules. Communication between states which use Hindi as their official language is required to be in Hindi, whereas communication between a state whose official language is Hindi and one whose is not, is required to be in English, or, in Hindi with an accompanying English translation (unless the receiving state agrees to dispense with the translation).

Communication between the union and states which use Hindi as their official language (classified by the Official Language Rules as "the states in Region A"), and with persons who live in those states, is generally in Hindi, except in certain cases. Communication with a second category of states "Region B", which do not use Hindi as their official language but have elected to communicate with the union in Hindi (currently Gujarat, Maharashtra, and Punjab) is usually in Hindi, whilst communications sent to an individual in those states may be in Hindi and English. Communication with all other states "Region C", and with people living in them, is in English.

Writing systems 

Each official language has a designated official script using which it is written for official purposes.

See also 

 Languages of India
 List of languages by number of native speakers in India
 Indian States by most spoken scheduled languages
The Eighth Schedule to the Indian Constitution

Notes

References

External links 
 Department of Official Language (DOL) – Official webpage explains the chronological events related to Official Languages Act and amendments
 Central Institute of Indian Languages – A comprehensive central government site that offers complete info on Indian Languages (archived 13 December 2004)
 Reconciling Linguistic Diversity: The History and the Future of Language Policy in India by Jason Baldridge
 Multilingualism and language policy in India (archived 7 February 2012)
 Words and phrases in more than 30 Indian languages

India
Languages of India
Official languages